Northumberland Betrayed By Douglas (also Northumberland Betrayed by Dowglas) is Child ballad 176. It has a Roud Folk Song Index number of 4006. It tells of the Seventh Earl of Northumberland fleeing to Scotland.

Synopsis
The Earl of Northumberland, Thomas Percy, escapes to Scotland and is taken into custody. Despite his protestations of virtue, he is passed from hand to hand, ending in the custody of Douglas. Earl Percy sets sail, with the mindset that he will be freed, but instead ends up under the control of Lord Hunsden.

References

 

Child Ballads
Year of song unknown
Songwriter unknown